Rhett is both a given name and a surname. Notable people with the name include:

Given name

 Rhett Akins (born 1969), American country singer and songwriter
 Rhett Bernstein (born 1987), American soccer player
 Rhett Biglands (born 1977), former Australian rules footballer
 Rhett Davies (born 1949), English record producer and engineer
 Rhett Forrester (1956–1994), American musician and lead singer of the band Riot
 Rhett Harty (born 1970), American former soccer defender
 Rhett Hall (born 1968), American National Football League defensive lineman
 Rhett Lawrence record producer and songwriter
 Rhett Lockyear (born 1983), Australian cricket player
 Rhett McLaughlin (born 1977), YouTube personality
 Rhett Miller (born 1970), lead singer of the alternative country band Old 97's
 Rhett Titus, ring name of professional wrestler Everett Lawrence Titus (born 1987)
 Rhett Warrener (born 1976), Canadian retired hockey defenceman
 Rhett Wiseman (born 1994), American baseball player

Surname

 Alicia Rhett (1915–2014), American portrait painter and actress; acted in Gone with the Wind
 Cecily Rhett (contemporary), American film editor
 Errict Rhett (born 1970), American professional football player
 Robert Rhett (1800–1876), American secessionist politician from South Carolina; U.S. senator 1850–1852; Confederate congressman
William Rhett (fl. early 18th century), American colonial leader from South Carolina

Stage name
 Thomas Rhett (born 1990), American singer

Fictional characters
 Rhett Butler, from the 1936 novel and 1939 film Gone with the Wind
 Rhett the Boston Terrier, official costumed mascot of the Boston University and Boston University Academy Terriers

English masculine given names